The Trillium Stakes is a Canadian Thoroughbred horse race run annually at Woodbine Racetrack in Toronto, Ontario. Held in June, it is open to fillies and mares, age three and older.

The Trillium Stakes was first run in 2011 and was elevated to Grade III status in 2018. The race is run on Woodbine's synthetic dirt track: the surface was Polytrack until 2017 when it was replaced by Tapeta.

Records
Speed  record:
 1:43.29 - Checkered Past (2014, 2015)

Most wins:
 2 - Checkered Past (2014, 2015)

Most wins by an owner:
 2 - Live Oak Plantation (2020, 2021)
 2 - Sam-Son Farm (2014, 2015)
 2 - Gary Barber (2013, 2019)

Most wins by a jockey:
 4 - Eurico Rosa da Silva (2013, 2014, 2015, 2018)

Most wins by a trainer:
 2 - Michael J. Trombetta (2020, 2021)
 2 - Mark Casse (2013, 2019)
 2 - Malcolm Pierce (2014, 2015)

Winners

See also
 List of Canadian flat horse races

References

Graded stakes races in Canada
Mile category horse races for fillies and mares
Recurring sporting events established in 2011
Woodbine Racetrack
2011 establishments in Ontario